The Utah Grand Prix is a weekend of sports car and stock car races held since 2006 at Miller Motorsports Park in Tooele, Utah. Until 2010, it was a round of the American Le Mans Series, and since 2007, it was a round of the regional NASCAR K&N Pro Series West stock car competition. The weekend also features selected SCCA and IMSA races, including the Pirelli World Challenge.

Winners

American Le Mans Series

NASCAR K&N Pro Series West

2008, 2011, 2013: Race extended due to an overtime finish.

References
Miller Motorsports Park archive at Racing Sports Cars
Miller Motorsports Park archive at Racing-Reference

 
NASCAR races at Miller Motorsports Park
Recurring sporting events established in 2006